Daryl Collins (born 15 July 1956) is  a former Australian rules footballer who played with Footscray in the Victorian Football League (VFL).		

Daryl's father Jack Cecil Collins played 31 games at Fitzroy and 13 with Essendon, he played on a wing in Essendon's 1950 premiership team.
His brother Denis Collins played 147 games (100 with Footscray, 30 with Carlton and 17 with Richmond).

Notes

External links 
		

Living people
1956 births
Australian rules footballers from Melbourne
Western Bulldogs players
Braybrook Football Club players
People from Braybrook, Victoria